The posterior cutaneous nerve of the thigh (also called the posterior femoral cutaneous nerve) is a sensory nerve of the thigh. It is a branch of the sacral plexus. It supplies the skin of the posterior surface of the thigh, leg, buttock, and also the perineum.

Structure

Origin 
The posterior cutaneous nerve of the thigh is a branch of the sacral plexus. It arises partly from the dorsal divisions of the S1-S2, and from the ventral divisions of S2-S3 sacral spinal nerves.

Course 
It leaves the pelvis through the greater sciatic foramen below the piriformis muscle. It then descends beneath the gluteus maximus muscle with the inferior gluteal artery, and runs down the back of the thigh beneath the fascia lata. It runs over the long head of the biceps femoris to the back of the knee. It then pierces the deep fascia, and accompanies the small saphenous vein to about the middle of the back of the leg. Its terminal branches communicate with the sural nerve.

Branches 
Its branches are all cutaneous, and are distributed to the gluteal region, the perineum, and the back of the thigh and leg.
 The inferior clunial nerves (or gluteal branches), three or four in number, turn upward around the lower border of the gluteus maximus, and supply the skin covering the lower and lateral part of that muscle.
 The perineal branches are distributed to the skin at the upper and medial side of the thigh. 
 The main part to the back of the thigh and leg consists of numerous filaments derived from both sides of the nerve, and distributed to the skin covering the back and medial side of the thigh, the popliteal fossa, and the upper part of the back of the leg.

Function 
The posterior cutaneous nerve of the thigh supplies the posterior surface of the thigh, the leg, and the gluteal region, as well as the perineum.

Clinical significance 
The posterior cutaneous nerve of the thigh may be involved in pain in the posterior thigh.

Additional images

References

External links 
 

Nerves of the lower limb and lower torso